Iulian Roșu (born 30 May 1994) is a Romanian professional footballer who plays as an attacking midfielder for Dinamo București.

Club career

Steaua București

In June 2011, Roșu signed a professional contract with FCSB. Iulian Roșu made his debut for FCSB on 26 November 2011 in a game against Brașov.

International career

Iulian Roșu made his debut for Romania U-17 in a game against Kazakhstan U-17. He played with the under-17 team at the 2011 UEFA European Under-17 Football Championship.

Honours

FCSB
Liga I: 2012–13
Supercupa României: 2013

Astra Giurgiu
Liga I: 2015–16

References

External links
 
 
 

1994 births
Living people
Footballers from Bucharest
Romanian footballers
Association football midfielders
Liga I players
Liga II players
FC Steaua București players
AFC Săgeata Năvodari players
FC Rapid București players
FC Astra Giurgiu players
ACS Poli Timișoara players
FC Olimpia Satu Mare players
FC Metaloglobus București players
FC Politehnica Iași (2010) players
CS Sportul Snagov players
FC Gloria Buzău players
FC Brașov (2021) players
FC Dinamo București players